Sir John Winthrop Hackett Sr.  (4 February 184819 February 1916), generally known as "Winthrop Hackett", was a proprietor and editor of several newspapers in Western Australia, a politician and a university chancellor.

Early life
Hackett was born near Bray, County Wicklow, Ireland, the eldest child of the Rev. John Winthrop Hackett, M.A., and his wife, Jane Sophia Monck-Mason, (daughter of Henry Monck-Mason, LL.D.). Educated at Trinity College, Dublin, he graduated BA in 1871 and MA in 1874. He was called to the Irish bar in 1874, but emigrated to Sydney, in 1875 where he was called to the New South Wales bar in the same year.

Career
Hackett took up journalism and contributed to the Sydney Morning Herald, but in 1876 went to Melbourne to become vice-principal and tutor in law, logic and political economy, at Trinity College. He also contributed to The Age and the Melbourne Review. In 1880 he was a candidate for Normanby at an election for the Victorian Legislative Assembly as an advanced liberal, but was badly defeated and lost his deposit.

At a later election Hackett was opposed to John Madden, and this time lost by only a small margin. At the end of 1882 he resigned his positions at Trinity College and went to Western Australia to become a squatter in the Gascoyne district. Among other properties, he took up Wooramel Station; his first season was a bad one and he decided to give up the land. He joined forces with Charles Harper, the proprietor of The West Australian, and very soon his influence on this paper began to be felt. 

The Western Mail was established in 1885 and both papers became prosperous. In 1887 Hackett became editor of The West Australian and was a strong advocate of responsible government. Western Australia received its constitution in 1890, and Alexander Forrest selected Hackett as the first man to be asked to join the nominee Western Australian Legislative Council. 

The population of the colony was still under 50,000 but was beginning to rise, and the discovery of gold accelerated this. The newspapers grew with the population and became very valuable properties. Hackett, as editor, was writing a daily leading article, and was also the business manager.

In 1894, Hackett was elected to the Legislative Council as representative of the south-western province, and held this seat until his death. He was a delegate to the 1891 and 1897 Federal conventions, and was appointed a member of the constitutional committee. He was asked to join more than one ministry, but had to decline as it was impossible for him to add to the work he was already doing. He was also of the opinion that, as a newspaper editor, he would no longer be able to speak with the same freedom if he were in office. He advocated women's suffrage, and Western Australia was one of the early jurisdictions to give women the vote. He also strongly supported Forrest in his development policy, in the building of the pipe line to the goldfields, and the making of Fremantle harbour. He was interesting himself very much in the Perth public library, museums, and national gallery of which he became president, and also in the proposed university. He was a prominent member of the Church of England, holding the offices of registrar of the Diocese of Perth and chancellor of St George's Cathedral. He declined a knighthood in 1902 but accepted it in 1911, and two years later was created KCMG.

The University of Western Australia opened in 1913 with Sir John as its first chancellor, and he gave it its first substantial private contribution when he endowed the chair of agriculture. Hackett's partner, Charles Harper, died in 1912, and Hackett acquired full ownership of the West Australian for £88,000. Hackett suffered from Parkinsonism and his health began to fail in 1915. He took a trip to the eastern states which appeared to have benefited him; however he died suddenly on 19 February 1916 of a heart condition and was buried in Karrakatta Cemetery.

Family
On 3 August 1905, Hackett married the 18-year-old Deborah Vernon Brockman (1887–1965). He confided in his political ally Walter James, "This is in the strictest sense a 'marriage de convenance' ". The couple had four daughters, and a son also called John. John (1910–1997) also became Sir John Hackett, a popular and distinguished General in the British Army. After she was widowed, Lady Hackett remarried to become Lady Moulden, and finally – after an honorary doctorate and a further widowhood – married Basil Buller Murphy to become Dr. Deborah Buller Murphy.

A daughter Patricia Hackett (1908–1963) followed her father into the legal profession, and is today remembered for the Patricia Hackett Prize awarded by the University of Western Australia and endowed in her memory in 1965.

Legacy
Hackett was awarded the honorary degree of LL.D. by Trinity College, Dublin in June 1902. Under his will a bequest to the Church of England paid for the building of St George's College, the first residential college within the University of Western Australia. After provision for his widow and children, the residue of his estate went to the University which received the sum of £425,000. This was an unexpectedly large sum, because by the time that the university was ready to receive it in 1926, shares in The West Australian had increased greatly in value. £250,000 of this with accrued interest was used for the erection of a group of buildings which include Winthrop Hall and Hackett Hall, which were built in a much grander architectural style than might previously have been envisaged. Another £200,000 was used to set up a fund which still provides scholarships, bursaries and other financial help for deserving students.

The suburb of Hackett, in inner North Canberra, Australian Capital Territory, Australia bears his name, in recognition of his efforts to support the federation of the Australian colonies, which took place in 1901. Streets and a suburb in Perth are also named "Hackett" and "Winthrop".

The species epithet of the extinct giant echidna Murrayglossus hacketti honours Hackett.

Arms

References

Lyall Hunt, 'Hackett, Sir John Winthrop (1848–1916)', Australian Dictionary of Biography, Volume 9, MUP, 1983, pp 150–153. Retrieved on 1 January 2009

1848 births
1916 deaths
Alumni of Trinity College Dublin
Australian Knights Bachelor
Australian Knights Commander of the Order of St Michael and St George
Australian politicians awarded knighthoods
Australian federationists
Australian newspaper proprietors
Members of the Western Australian Legislative Council
University of Western Australia chancellors
Burials at Karrakatta Cemetery
Drake-Brockman family
The West Australian
Irish Anglicans
19th-century Australian businesspeople